Produced by George Martin is a 2001 various artists compilation box set of tracks produced by Sir George Martin.  It is also the title of a documentary film on George Martin co-produced by the BBC's Arena team and released in 2012 by Eagle Rock Entertainment on DVD and Blu-ray.

The audio box set was issued to commemorate Martin's 50-year career as a record producer.  The recordings are not in chronological order, but are instead grouped together by common themes.

A single CD compilation with highlights from this collection was released on 6 November 2006.

The film documentary was first aired by the BBC in the United Kingdom on 25 April 2011.  It combines rare archive footage and new interviews with, among others, Paul McCartney, Ringo Starr, Jeff Beck, Cilla Black and Giles Martin.  The DVD and Blu-ray was released worldwide on 10 September 2012 and includes over 50 minutes of out-takes and bonus interview footage from Rick Rubin, T-Bone Burnett and Ken Scott.

Track listing

Disc One (Crazy Rhythms)
"Pickin' A Chicken" – Eve Boswell with Glenn Somers & His Orchestra
"I Got it Bad And That Ain't Good" – Cleo Laine with Johnny Dankworth & His Orchestra
"Hayfoot, Strawfoot" – The Kenny Baker Quartet 1953
"High Society" – Graeme Bell's Australian Jazz Band 	
"Princess Elizabeth of England" – The Luton Girls' Choir with the Band of The Irish Guards	
"Romanza" – Roberto Inglez & His Orchestra
"Melody on the Move" – Tommy Reilly with the Vic Hammett Quartet
"Ae Fond Kiss" – Kenneth McKellar
"Bluebell Polka" – Jimmy Shand & His Band
"Scottish Polka" – Mickie Ainsworth & Jimmy Blue 	
"Dashing White Sergeant" – The Glasgow Phoenix Choir 	
"Arriverderci Darling" – Edna Savage and the Nuffield Centre Chorus
"Away in a Manger" – Kirkintilloch Junior Choir with Joan Summers and Moira Anderson
"Robin Hood" – Dick James with Stephen James & His Chorus, and Ron Goodwin's Orchestra
"Portrait of My Love" – Matt Monro 1960	
"Won't You Come Home, Bill Bailey" – Freddy Randall & His Band 	
"Experiments With Mice" – Johnny Dankworth & His Orchestra	
"Oi! Oi! Oi!" – Joe Daniels & His Band and the Butlins Campers	
"Saturday Jump" – Humphrey Lyttelton & His Band 	
"Crazy Rhythm" – Max Geldray with Wally Stott & His Orchestra
"My Kind of Girl" – Matt Monro 1961	
"Hi"-Flutin' Boogie – John Scott
"Earth Angel" (Will You Be Mine?) – The Southlanders with Philip Green & His Orchestra 1955
"Don't You Rock Me Daddy-O" – The Vipers Skiffle Group 1956	
"Skiffling Strings" – Ron Goodwin & His Concert Orchestra 	
"Be My Girl" – Jim Dale 	
"No Other Baby" – The Vipers 1958
"Sun Arise" – Rolf Harris 	1962
"You're Driving Me Crazy" – The Temperance Seven with Paul McDowell

Disc Two (Transports of Delights)
"The Q5 Piano Tune" – Spike Milligan
"Unchained Melody" – Peter Sellers
"Mock Mozart" – Peter Ustinov and Anthony Hopkins 1953
"A Transport of Delight" – Flanders and Swann 1960
"Nellie the Elephant" – Mandy Miller
"Little Red Monkey" – Joy Nichols, Jimmy Edwards & Dick Bentley
"Goodness Gracious Me" – Peter Sellers & Sophia Loren 1960
"The Wormwood Scrubs Tango" – Spike Milligan 1962
"The Hippopotamus Song" – Ian Wallace and Donald Swann
"Any Old Iron" – Peter Sellers and the Mate's Spoffle Group with Fred Spoons 1957
"The Hole in the Ground" – Bernard Cribbins
"Aftermyth of War" – Beyond The Fringe Cast
"All The Things You Are" – Peter Sellers 1958
"The Horse Show" – Michael Bentine
"The End of the World" – Beyond The Fringe Cast
"My Boomerang Won't Come Back" – Charlie Drake
"A Drop of the Hard Stuff" – Peter Sellers 1958
"You Gotta Go Oww!" – Spike Milligan, Count Jimmy Moriarty, Graveley Stephens and the Massed Alberts
"Morse Code Melody" – The Alberts with Professor Bruce Lacey and Vox Humana
"I've Lost My Mummy" – Rolf Harris 1963
"My Brother" – Terry Scott
"Judge Not" – Cambridge Circus Cast
"The Gas Man Cometh" – Flanders and Swann 1964	
"Right Said Fred" – Bernard Cribbins
"Football Results" – Michael Bentine
"Jake The Peg" – Rolf Harris 1966
"The Highway Code" – The Master Singers
"A Hard Day's Night" – Peter Sellers 1965
"She Loves You" – Peter Sellers 1965

Disc Three (That Was the Decade That Was)
"Please Please Me" – The Beatles 1963
"How Do You Do It?" – Gerry & The Pacemakers 1963	
"Do You Want to Know a Secret" – Billy J. Kramer with The Dakotas 1963	
"Hello Little Girl" – The Fourmost 1963	
"I Want to Hold Your Hand" – The Beatles 1963	
"The Cruel Sea" – The Dakotas 1963	
"That Was the Week That Was" – Millicent Martin with David Frost 1963
"Bad to Me" – Billy J. Kramer with The Dakotas 1963	
"Anyone Who Had a Heart" – Cilla Black 1964	
"Don't Let the Sun Catch You Crying" – Gerry & The Pacemakers 1964	
"I'll Keep You Satisfied" – Billy J. Kramer with The Dakotas 1963	
"A Little Lovin'" – The Fourmost 1964	
"Little Children" – Billy J. Kramer with The Dakotas 1964
"You're My World (Il Mio Mondo)" – Cilla Black 1964
"Yesterday" – The Beatles 1965	
"You'll Never Walk Alone" – Gerry & The Pacemakers 1963 	
"I (Who Have Nothing)" – Shirley Bassey 1963	
"In the Summer of His Years" – Millicent Martin 1963	
"It's For You" – Cilla Black 1964	
"It's You" – Alma Cogan with Stan Foster & His Orchestra 1964
"Ferry Cross the Mersey" – Gerry & The Pacemakers	1964
"Can't Buy Me Love" – Ella Fitzgerald 	1964
"I've Been Wrong Before" – Cilla Black 1965	
"In My Life" – The Beatles 1965	
"Land of a Thousand Dances" – The Action 1965	
"Alfie" – Cilla Black 1966	
"Michelle" – David and Jonathan 1966	
"Step Inside Love" – Cilla Black 	1968
"She's Leaving Home" – David and Jonathan 1967	
"When I'm Sixty-Four" – Bernard Cribbins 1967	
"Time" – Cilla Black 1967

Disc Four (Gold Fingers)
"Coronation Scot" – Sidney Torch & His Orchestra (from Paul Temple)
"Chopin: Prelude in C Minor, Op. 28 No. 20" – Sidney Harrison (piano)
"Mozart: Serenade in E flat major, K. 375, Fourth Movement" – London Baroque Ensemble 	
"Mozart: Serenade in E flat major, K. 375, Fifth Movement" – London Baroque Ensemble 	
"The Lark Ascending" – London Philharmonic Orchestra 	
"Barwick Green" – Sidney Torch & His Orchestra (from The Archers)	
"The White Suit Samba" – Jack Parnell & His Rhythm 1952	
"Time Beat" – Ray Cathode 	
"Theme from Limelight" – Ron Goodwin & His Orchestra 	
"Elizabethan Serenade (Where the Gentle Avon Flows)" – Ron Goodwin & His Orchestra 	
"Murder She Says" – Ron Goodwin & His Orchestra (from Murder She Said)	
"I Like Money" – Nadia Gray (from Mr. Topaze)	
"Double Scotch" – Ron Goodwin & His Orchestra 	
"No One Will Ever Know" – Matt Monro 1961
"The Dr. Kildare Theme" – Johnnie Spence and his Orchestra 1961	
"Ringo's Theme (This Boy)" – The George Martin Orchestra 	1964
"633 Squadron Theme" – Ron Goodwin & His Orchestra 1964	
"From Russia with Love" – Matt Monro 1963
"All Quiet on the Mersey Front" – The George Martin Orchestra 	
"Goldfinger" – Shirley Bassey 1964	
"By George! It's The David Frost Theme" – The George Martin Orchestra 	
"Love in the Open Air" – The George Martin Orchestra (from The Family Way) 1967	
"Thingumybob" – The George Martin Orchestra 1968
"Theme One" – The George Martin Orchestra 	
"Snakes Alive" – The George Martin Orchestra (from Live and Let Die)
"The Ticlaw Anthem" – The George Martin Orchestra (from Honky Tonk Freeway)
"Where Eagles Dare" – Ron Goodwin (from Where Eagles Dare) 1968

Disc Five (Smiles of the Beyond)
"Marrakesh Express" – Stan Getz 1969
"Icarus" – Paul Winter 1973
"Marblehead Messenger" – Seatrain 	
"Sans Souci" – John Williams 1973	
"Live and Let Die" – Paul McCartney & Wings 1973
"Juniper Bear" – Paul Winter and Winter Consort 1973
"The Smile of the Beyond" – John McLaughlin & The Mahavishnu Orchestra 1974
"Tin Man" – America 1974	
"Pinafore Days" – Stackridge 	
"Sunday" – Cleo Laine 	1976
"Diamond Dust" – Jeff Beck 1975	
"Sister Golden Hair" – America 1975	
"The Moon Is a Harsh Mistress" – Jimmy Webb 1977	
"Amarillo" – Neil Sedaka 1971
"Get Back" – Billy Preston 1970	
"The Highwayman" – Jimmy Webb 1977	
"No More Fear of Flying" – Gary Brooker 1979	
"World's Greatest Lover" – Cheap Trick 1980

Disc Six (Nice Work)
"Ebony and Ivory" – Paul McCartney and Stevie Wonder 1982
"Hymn" – Ultravox 1982	
"Say Say Say" – Paul McCartney and Michael Jackson 1983
"Our Perfect Song" – Kenny Rogers 	1985
"No More Lonely Nights" – Paul McCartney 1984	
"I Love You, Samantha" – The King's Singers 1990
"Love Dust" – Mary Hopkin and Freddie Jones 1988	
"Mr Waldo, Come and Sweep My Chimbley" – Tom Jones 1988	
"Memory" – José Carreras 1990	
"Pinball Wizard" – Tommy Cast 1993	
"Nice Work If You Can Get It" – Larry Adler featuring Sting 1994	
"My Man's Gone Now" – Larry Adler featuring Sinéad O'Connor 1994
"Rhapsody in Blue" – Larry Adler featuring George Martin 1994
"Summertime" – Larry Adler featuring Peter Gabriel 1994 	
"The Pepperland Suite" – George Martin 1998	
"Here, There and Everywhere" – Celine Dion 1998
"Friends and Lovers" – George Martin 1998

Single CD Track listing
 "Theme One" · The George Martin Orchestra · 2.31
 "I Want To Hold Your Hand" · The Beatles · 2.26
 "Anyone Who Had a Heart" · Cilla Black · 2.51
 "Ferry Cross The Mersey" · Gerry & The Pacemakers · 2.24
 "Do You Want to Know a Secret?" · Billy J Kramer & The Dakotas · 2.03
 "Live and Let Die" · Paul McCartney & Wings · 3.12
 "Goldfinger" · Shirley Bassey · 2.49
 "She's Leaving Home" · David & Jonathan · 3.14
 "Portrait of My Love" · Matt Monro · 2.46
 "Elizabethan Serenade (Where the Gentle Avon Flows)" · Ron Goodwin & His Orchestra · 2.53
 "A Hard Day's Night" · Peter Sellers · 1.49
 "Melody on the Move" · Tommy Reilly · 2.50
 "Wormwood Scrubs Tango" · Spike Milligan & Orchestra · 2.33
 "Goodness Gracious Me" · Peter Sellers & Sophia Loren · 3.00
 "A Transport of Delight" · Flanders & Swann · 2.23
 "The Pepperland Suite" · George Martin · 6.18
 "From Russia with Love" · Matt Monro · 2.35
 "Alfie" · Cilla Black · 2.39
 "Get Back" · Billy Preston · 3.00
 "Mr. Waldo, Come and Sweep My Chimbley" · Tom Jones · 2.58
 "Tin Man" · America · 3.29
 "Diamond Dust" · Jeff Beck · 8.21
 "Here, There and Everywhere" · Celine Dion · 3.17
 "Friends and Lovers" · George Martin · 2.25

George Martin albums
Albums produced by George Martin
2001 compilation albums
Parlophone compilation albums
Capitol Records compilation albums
Albums conducted by George Martin
Albums arranged by George Martin
2011 television films
2011 documentary films
2011 films
Documentary films about the Beatles
Documentary films about the music industry